Justin McCarthy, 1st Viscount Mountcashel, PC (Ire) ( – 1694), was a Jacobite general in the Williamite War in Ireland and a personal friend of James II. He commanded Irish Army troops during the conflict, enjoying initial success when he seized Bandon in County Cork in 1689. However, he was defeated and captured at the Battle of Newtownbutler later in the same year. He escaped and was accused of having broken parole. After the end of the war, he led an Irish Brigade overseas for service in the French Army. He died in French exile.

Birth and origins 
Justin was born about 1643, probably in Blarney, County Cork, Ireland. He was the third son of Donough McCarthy and his wife Eleanor Butler. At the time of his birth, Justin's father was the 2nd Viscount Muskerry, but he would be advanced to Earl of Clancarty in 1658. His father's family were the MacCartys of Muskerry, a Gaelic Irish dynasty that branched from the MacCarthy-Mor line with Dermot MacCarthy, second son of Cormac MacCarthy-Mor, a medieval Prince of Desmond. This second son had been granted the Muskerry area as appanage.

Justin's mother was the eldest sister of James Butler, at that time Marquess of Ormond. Her family, the Butlers, were Old English and descended from Theobald Walter, who had been appointed Chief Butler of Ireland by King Henry II in 1177. Justin's parents were both Catholic; they had married before 1641.

Irish wars 
Justin was born during the Irish Confederate Wars in the part of Ireland that was then held by the Irish confederacy. His father was then a member of the confederacy's Supreme Council and commander of its Munster army. Justin was two in 1645 when his mother hosted Giovanni Battista Rinuccini, sent as nuncio to Ireland by Pope Innocent X, at Macroom Castle. His father opposed Rinuccini's dealings in Irish politics and when the nuncio seized power in a coup d'état in 1646, Justin's father was detained at Kilkenny Castle and stripped of the command of the Munster Army.

Exile 
In April 1650 his family lost Macroom Castle, where Justin had spent his childhood, in the context of the Battle of Macroom. Around that time, anticipating the loss of Macroom or because of it, his father sent Justin, his mother, and sisters to security in France. His mother then lived in Paris, in the convent of the Feuillantines.

After Rinuccini's departure, his father fought the Parliamentarians in the Cromwellian Conquest of Ireland. Muskerry fought to the bitter end, surrendering Ross Castle near Killarney to Edmund Ludlow in June 1652.

In 1658 his father was created Earl of Clancarty by Charles II in Brussels, where he was then in exile. By this advancement the title of the viscount of Muskerry became a subsidiary title of the family, which was given as courtesy title to the Earl's heir apparent, at that time his eldest brother Charles, who was therefore styled Viscount Muskerry thereafter.

Restoration 
The family had their property confiscated under the Cromwellian regime, but it was restored to them at the Restoration of Charles II. Justin seems to have grown up mainly in France. He became a professional soldier and showed great skill in his profession, but poor eyesight hampered his career. He entered the French army in 1671, and then transferred to the Duke of Monmouth's regiment, then in French pay, and served against the Dutch.

On 4 March 1665, the Second Anglo-Dutch War broke out. Three months into the war, on 3 June 1665 O.S., his brother Charles, Lord Muskerry, was killed on the flagship, the Royal Charles, in the Battle of Lowestoft, the first major naval engagement of the war and an English victory. His brother had an infant son, also named Charles, who succeeded him as heir apparent and was, therefore, styled Viscount of Muskerry. However, their father, the 1st Earl, died two months later, on 4 August 1665, and the younger Charles succeeded as the 2nd Earl of Clancarty. The 2nd Earl died about a year later, on 22 September 1666, still an infant. Thereupon Callaghan, the infant's uncle, succeeded as the 3rd Earl of Clancarty.

Justin McCarthy came to England in 1678 and was befriended by the future James II, who generally chose soldiers, especially Irish soldiers, as his boon companions. Charles II decided to use his services in Ireland, and made him a colonel in Sir Thomas Dongan's regiment. On the outbreak of the Popish Plot, however, the discovery of Colonel McCarthy's presence at Whitehall caused uproar: he fled the country, and the Secretary of State, Sir Joseph Williamson, who had issued his commission, was sent to the Tower of London.

Meddling in nephew's marriage 
By 1683 Colonel MacCarthy was at Court again, where his growing influence was shown by the marriage he arranged for his immensely wealthy nephew Donough MacCarthy, 4th Earl of Clancarty. Callaghan, the 3rd Earl, had died in 1676, leaving his young son in the care of his widow, Lady Elizabeth FitzGerald, daughter of George FitzGerald, 16th Earl of Kildare: she has been described as "a fierce Protestant isolated in a Catholic family". She placed her son in the care of John Fell, Bishop of Oxford, for a Protestant education. Colonel MacCarthy was determined to have the final word on the young earl's marriage and religion, and persuaded the King to invite the young earl to Court for Christmas. He brought that letter in person to the bishop. Here Donough MacCarthy, at sixteen, was married to Elizabeth Spencer who was two years younger. The marriage would not be consummated for many years. The bride was a daughter of Robert Spencer, 2nd Earl of Sunderland. The Earl of Sunderland was a Protestant at that time but had Catholic leanings and would turn a Catholic in 1687. The marriage was a failure, and Kenyon, Sunderland's biographer, remarked that it left a stain on the reputation of all those who ruined the lives of these two young people, without gaining anything in return. Gilbert Burnet wrote that in anything that did not directly concern his religion, MacCarthy was an honourable man.

Under James II 
Under the Catholic King James II, McCarthy was in 1686 promoted to Major General and became a member of the Privy Council of Ireland. He quarrelled with the Lord Lieutenant of Ireland, the 2nd Earl of Clarendon, and probably intrigued to secure Clarendon's recall.

In 1688 or early in 1689, Tyrconnell appointed him Muster-Master General in the Irish Army and Lord Lieutenant of County Cork.

On 23 May 1689, James II elevated Justin McCarthy to being Viscount Mountcashel, with the subsidiary title of Baron Castleinch. These titles were in what later became known as the Jacobite peerage.

Later in 1689, Lord Mountcashel, as he was now, took Castlemartyr and Bandon for James; at Bandon there was a massacre called "Bloody Monday", but Mountcashel persuaded the King to issue a general pardon to his defeated opponents. He met James II at his landing at Kinsale, and was commanded to raise seven regiments. He sat in the Irish House of Lords in the Parliament of 1689.

With 3,000 men he advanced from Dublin towards Enniskillen, which with Derry was one of the two places still resisting James II. He was met by 2,000 Protestant 'Inniskilleners' at the Battle of Newtownbutler on 31 July 1689. Mountcashel's forces were routed; he was wounded, then captured. Allowed out on parole he broke parole and escaped to Dublin; Schomberg remarked that he had thought McCarthy was a man of honour, but on the other hand he expected no better from an Irishman.

He went into exile in France and commanded the first Irish Brigade of Louis XIV.

Marriage 
He married Lady Arabella Wentworth, daughter of Thomas Wentworth, 1st Earl of Strafford and his second wife Lady Arabella Holles, who was many years older than himself; they had no documented or legally recognized children; however, it is believed his lineage continued.

Death and timeline 
His later career was hampered by his near-blindness. He died on 1 July 1694 N.S. at Barèges where he had gone to take the waters for his health and was buried there. At his death he tried to leave his property to a cousin, but it passed to his niece Catherine, sister of the 4th Earl of Clancarty. Her husband, Paul Davys, had the title Viscount Mount Cashell revived in his own favour.

Notes and references

Notes

Citations

Sources 

 
  – 1642 to 1660
  (for MacCarty)
  – (for Ormond)
  – 1673 to 1685
 
  – 1643 to 1660
 
 
  – L to M
  – N to R (for Ormond)
  – Canonteign to Cutts (for Clancarty)
  – Eardley of Spalding to Goojerat (for Fingall)
  – Scotland and Ireland
  – 1625 to 1655
  – (for timeline)
 
 
 
 
  – Viscounts (for Butler, Viscount Mountgarrett)
 
  – (Snippet view)
  (for its frontispiece)
  – Irish stem
 
 
 
 
 

1640s births
1694 deaths
People from County Cork
French military personnel of the Nine Years' War
Irish Jacobites
Irish MPs 1689
MacCarthy
MacCarthy dynasty
Members of the Irish House of Lords
Viscounts in the Jacobite peerage
Year of birth uncertain
Younger sons of earls